is a junction passenger railway station located in the city of Nishinomiya, Hyōgo Prefecture, Japan. It is operated by the private transportation company Hankyu Railway. It is one of the main stations in Nishinomiya City, with Hanshin Nishinomiya Station and JR Nishinomiya Station.

Lines
The platforms of Hankyu Imazu Line to Takarazuka Station, northbound, and Imazu Station, southbound are separated, and so there are no through trains from Takarazuka to Imazu.

Layout

Kobe Line: 2 island platforms and 2 side platforms serving 2 tracks each.

Imazu Line (south): an elevated side platform serving a track.

Imazu Line (north): 3 bay platforms serving 2 tracks.

History
Nishinomiya-Kitaguchi Station opened on 16 July 1920 when the Kobe Main Line opened. The Imazu Line opened the next year.

Nishinomiya-Kitaguchi Station was damaged by the Great Hanshin earthquake in January 1995. Restoration work on the Kobe Line took 7 months to complete.

Station numbering was introduced on 21 December 2013, with Nishinomiya-Kitaguchi being designated as station number HK-08.

Past layout

There were four 90-degree diamond crossings served by the Kobe Line and the Imazu Line until they were removed in 1984 to build the new station building. The crossings were located in the south of the platforms for the Imazu Line, between the westbound platforms and the eastbound platforms for the Kobe Line.

Kobe Line westbound platforms: on the east side of the Imazu Line, an island platform serving 2 tracks with a side platform for arrivals in the south.

Kobe Line eastbound platforms: on the west side of the Imazu Line, an island platform serving 2 tracks with a side platform for arrivals in the north.

Imazu Line: on the north side of the Kobe Line, a side platform and a dead-end platform serving 4 tracks, one of which tracks was removed in 1977.

Passenger statistics
In fiscal 2019, the station was used by an average of 57,674 passengers daily

Buses

Surrounding area
Hankyu Railway Nishinomiya Garage
Hankyu Nishinomiya Gardens (formerly Hankyu Nishinomiya Stadium)
Hyogo Performing Arts Center
ACTA Nishinomiya
Koshien Gakuin
Koshien Junior College

See also
List of railway stations in Japan
Orix Buffaloes - The Hankyu Braves, predecessors of the Orix Buffaloes, were based at Nishinomiya Stadium and Nishinomiya-Kitaguchi Station was the nearest station. In those days, train conductors called the station name as "Nishinomiya-kitaguchi, Nishinomiya Stadium-mae".  Now there is Hankyu Nishinomiya Gardens opened on November 26, 2008 on the vacant lot where the stadium used to be, and the station name is announced "Nishinomiya-kitaguchi, Hankyu Nishinomiya Gardens-mae".
The Melancholy of Haruhi Suzumiya - "Kitaguchi station" in this anime was modeled on this station.

References

External links 

 Station website (in English)
 Station website (in Japanese) 

Railway stations in Hyōgo Prefecture
Hankyū Kōbe Main Line
Hankyu Railway Imazu Line
Railway stations in Japan opened in 1920
Nishinomiya